Skakavac (lit. "grasshopper") is a waterfall in Bosnia and Herzegovina. At , it is one of the tallest waterfalls in the Balkans and traverses a vertical limestone face. The waterfall freezes in winter into a number of shapes. Part of a stream of the same name, it flows below the peak of the  Bukovik into Perak Creek. Vegetation around the waterfall consists of endemic and relict plants. Nearby trails are frequented by mountain bikers and hikers. In 2002, the waterfall and its surroundings were declared a natural monument by the Sarajevo Canton government.

Tourist attraction 
The main tourist attraction of the park - Skakavac waterfall - can be reached by trail. The trailhead is accessible by bus or car and by foot. Visitors can travel to the waterfall trailhead from Nahorevo or hike from Sarajevo through Nahorevo and the Skakavac Nature Preserve. The waterfall may also be reached by vehicle, with rest areas available along the trail.

Gallery

See also
 Skakavac Waterfall, Perućica, another waterfall in Bosnia

References

Waterfalls of Bosnia and Herzegovina
Landforms of the Federation of Bosnia and Herzegovina
Tourist attractions in Bosnia and Herzegovina
Sarajevo Canton
Nature parks of Bosnia and Herzegovina
Protected areas of Bosnia and Herzegovina
Protected areas established in 2002